John Ayscough (d. 1735) was Chief Justice of Jamaica in 1724. 

Ayscough also served as Acting Governor of the Colony of Jamaica from 1726-8 and 1734-5, when the island was embroiled in fighting the Maroons in the First Maroon War. He was unsuccessful in his attempts to subdue the Jamaican Maroons. He died in 1735, during his second term as acting governor.

References 

Chief justices of Jamaica
Year of birth missing
1735 deaths
Governors of Jamaica
18th-century Jamaican judges